Hanford is an unincorporated community in Cerro Gordo County, in the U.S. state of Iowa.

History
A post office was established at Hanford in 1900, and remained in operation until it was discontinued in 1913. The community was named for Hanford McNider, the son of an Iowa banker.

Hanford's population was 22 in 1925.

References

Unincorporated communities in Cerro Gordo County, Iowa
Unincorporated communities in Iowa